Ricky Evans may refer to:

 Ricky Evans (rugby union) (born 1960), Welsh rugby union player
 Ricky Evans (darts player) (born 1990), English darts player

See also 
 Richard Evans (disambiguation)